Thyroid's secretory capacity (GT, also referred to as thyroid's incretory capacity, maximum thyroid hormone output, T4 output or, if calculated from serum levels of thyrotropin and thyroxine, as SPINA-GT) is the maximum stimulated amount of thyroxine that the thyroid can produce in a given time-unit (e.g. one second).

How to determine GT 
Experimentally, GT can be determined by stimulating the thyroid with a high thyrotropin concentration (e.g. by means of rhTSH, i.e. recombinant human thyrotropin) and measuring its output in terms of T4 production, or by measuring the serum concentration of protein-bound iodine-131 after administration of radioiodine. These approaches are, however, costly and accompanied by significant exposure to radiation.

In vivo, GT can also be estimated from equilibrium levels of TSH and T4 or free T4. In this case it is calculated with

or

: Theoretical (apparent) secretory capacity (SPINA-GT)
: Dilution factor for T4 (reciprocal of apparent volume of distribution, 0.1 L−1)
: Clearance exponent for T4 (1.1e-6 sec−1)
K41: Binding constant T4-TBG (2e10 L/mol)
K42: Binding constant T4-TBPA (2e8 L/mol)
DT: EC50 for TSH (2.75 mU/L)

The method is based on mathematical models of thyroid homeostasis. Calculating the secretory capacity with one of these equations is an inverse problem. Therefore, certain conditions (e.g. stationarity) have to be fulfilled to deliver a reliable result.

Specific secretory capacity

The ratio of SPINA-GT and thyroid volume VT (as determined e.g. by ultrasonography)

,

i.e.

or

is referred to as specific thyroid capacity (SPINA-GTs). It is a measure for how much one millilitre of thyroid tissue can produce under conditions of maximum stimulation. Thereby, SPINA-GTs is an estimate for the endocrine quality of thyroid tissue.

Reference Range 

The equations and their parameters are calibrated for adult humans with a body mass of 70 kg and a plasma volume of ca. 2.5 L.

Clinical significance

Validity 
SPINA-GT is elevated in primary hyperthyroidism and reduced in both primary hypothyroidism and untreated autoimmune thyroiditis. It has been observed to correlate (with positive direction) to resting energy expenditure, resting heart rate, the colour Doppler ultrasound pattern and thyroid volume, and (with negative direction) to thyroid autoantibody titres, which reflect organ destruction due to autoimmunity. Elevated SPINA-GT in Graves' disease is reversible with antithyroid treatment. While SPINA-GT is significantly altered in primary thyroid disorders, it is insensitive to disorders of secondary nature (e.g. pure pituitary diseases).

Reliability 
In silico experiments with Monte Carlo simulations demonstrated that both SPINA-GT and SPINA-GD can be estimated with sufficient reliability, even if laboratory assays have limited accuracy. This was confirmed by longitudinal in vivo studies that showed that GT has lower intraindividual variation (i.e. higher reliability) than TSH, FT4 or FT3.

Clinical utility 
In clinical trials SPINA-GT was significantly elevated in patients with Graves' disease and toxic adenoma compared to normal subjects. It is also elevated in diffuse and nodular goiters, and reduced in untreated autoimmune thyroiditis. In patients with toxic adenoma it has higher specificity and positive likelihood ratio for diagnosis of thyrotoxicosis than serum concentrations of thyrotropin, free T4 or free T3. GT's specificity is also high in thyroid disorders of secondary or tertiary origin.

Calculating SPINA-GT has proved to be useful in challenging clinical situations, e.g. for differential diagnosis of subclinical hypothyroidism and elevated TSH concentration due to type 2 allostatic load (as it is typical for obesity and certain psychiatric diseases). For this purpose, its usage has been recommended in sociomedical assessment.

Pathophysiological and therapeutic implications 
Correlation of SPINA-GT with creatinine clearance suggests a negative influence of uremic toxins on thyroid biology. In the initial phase of major non-thyroidal illness syndrome (NTIS) SPINA-GT may be temporarily elevated. In chronic NTIS as well as in certain non-critical chronic diseases, e.g. chronic fatigue syndrome or asthma SPINA-GT is slightly reduced.

According to the results of a community-based study in China it was associated to sleep duration and exercise habits. With respect to iodine supply, it showed a complex U-shaped pattern, being reduced in subjects consuming iodine-rich food, but elevated in situations of iodine excess. In another study from China, SPINA-GT correlated with negative direction to markers of obesity including body mass index, waist circumference and waist to hip ratio. This doesn't seem to be the case, however, in Western populations.

In women, therapy with Metformin results in increased SPINA-GT, in parallel to improved insulin sensitivity. This observation was reproducible in men with hypogonadism, but not in men with normal testosterone concentrations,. In postmenopausal women this effect was only observed in subjects on oestradiol replacement therapy. Therefore, the described phenomenon seems to depend on an interaction of metformin with sex hormones. In hyperthyroid men both SPINA-GT and SPINA-GD negatively correlate to erectile function, intercourse satisfaction, orgasmic function and sexual desire. Likewise, in women with thyrotoxicosis elevated thyroid's secretory capacity predicts depression and sexual dysfunction. Conversely, in androgen-deficient men with concomitant autoimmune thyroiditis, substitution therapy with testosterone leads to a decrease in thyroid autoantibody titres and an increase in SPINA-GT.

In patients with autoimmune thyroiditis a gluten-free diet results in increased SPINA-GT (in parallel to sinking autoantibody titres). Statin therapy has the same effect, but only if supply with vitamin D is sufficient. Accordingly, substitution therapy with 25-hydroxyvitamin D leads to rising secretory capacity. This effect is potentiated by substitution therapy with myo-inositol and selenomethionine or, in women, with dehydroepiandrosterone, but impaired in males with early-onset androgenic alopecia. The effects of vitamin D and selenomethionine are attenuated in hyperprolactinaemia, suggesting an inhibitory effect of prolactin. Although both vitamin D supplementation and gluten-free diet result in increased SPINA-GT, there seems to be a complex interaction between both therapeutic measures, since vitamin D treatment is only able to elevate the thyroid's secretory capacity in subjects not following any dietary recommendation.

On the other hand, men treated with spironolactone are faced with decreasing SPINA-GT (in addition to rising thyroid antibody titres). It has, therefore, been concluded that spironolactone may aggravate thyroid autoimmunity in men.

In subjects with type 2 diabetes, treatment with beta blockers resulted in decreased SPINA-GT, suggesting sympathetic innervation to contribute to the control of thyroid function. In diabetic women, but not in men, SPINA-GT shows a positive correlation to the β-C-terminal cross-linked telopeptides of type I collagen (β-CTX), a marker of bone resorption. In both diabetic and non-diabetic persons it correlates (negatively) with age and (positively) with the concentrations of troponin T and HbA1c.

A study in euthyroid subjects with structural heart disease found that increased SPINA-GT predicts the risk of malignant arrhythmia including ventricular fibrillation and ventricular tachycardia. This applies to both incidence and event-free survival. Likewise, SPINA-GT is elevated in a significant subgroup of patients with takotsubo syndrome. On the other hand, two studies found negative correlation between SPINA-GT and markers of dispersion in cardiac repolarisation, including Tp-e interval, JT interval, Tp-e/ QT ratio and Tp-e/QTc ratio. These results suggest that reduced thyroid function may trigger cardiovascular mortality as well.

Among subjects with Parkinson's disease, SPINA-GT is significantly elevated in tremor-dominant and mixed subtypes compared to the akinetic-rigid type.

Specific secretory capacity (SPINA-GTs) is reduced in obesity and autoimmune thyroiditis.

Endocrine disruptors may affect stimulated thyroid output, as demonstrated by a positive correlation of SPINA-GT with urinary mercury concentration and the excretion of certain phthalate metabolites.

See also
 Thyroid function tests
 Sum activity of peripheral deiodinases
 Jostel's TSH index
 Thyrotroph Thyroid Hormone Sensitivity Index
 Thyroid Feedback Quantile-based Index
 SimThyr
 SPINA-GBeta
 SPINA-GR

Notes

References

External links 

 SPINA Thyr: Open source software for calculating GT and GD
 Package "SPINA" for the statistical environment R

Chemical pathology
Blood tests
Endocrine procedures
Thyroidological methods
Thyroid homeostasis
Structure parameters of thyroid function
Static endocrine function tests